Seyf ol Din Kuh (also Romanized as Seyf ol Dīn Kūh, Seyf ed Dīn Kūh and Seyf od Dīn Kūh) is a village in Kuhsar Rural District, in the Central District of Hashtrud County, East Azerbaijan Province, Iran. At the 2006 census, its population was 21, in 5 families.

References 

Towns and villages in Hashtrud County